Gheorghe Ciochină (born 13 June 1951) is a Romanian boxer. He competed in the men's featherweight event at the 1976 Summer Olympics.

References

1951 births
Living people
Romanian male boxers
Olympic boxers of Romania
Boxers at the 1976 Summer Olympics
Place of birth missing (living people)
Featherweight boxers